This is a list of people who have served as Vice-Admiral of Sussex.

Sir William More 1559–1600
vacant
Charles Howard, 2nd Earl of Nottingham 1608–1642
Francis Lennard, 14th Baron Dacre bef. 1647–1650
Anthony Stapley 1651–1655 (Parliamentary)
vacant
Sir John Pelham, 3rd Baronet 1660–1703
Charles Goring 1703–1705
Thomas Pelham, 1st Baron Pelham 1705–1712
John Ashburnham, 3rd Baron Ashburnham 1712–1715
Thomas Pelham-Holles, 1st Duke of Newcastle 1715–1768
vacant
John Ashburnham, 2nd Earl of Ashburnham 1770–1812
Charles Lennox, 4th Duke of Richmond 1812–1819
George Wyndham, 3rd Earl of Egremont 1820–1831
Charles Gordon-Lennox, 5th Duke of Richmond 1831–1860

References
Institute of Historical Research

Somerset
Military history of Sussex